The 1857 Vermont gubernatorial election for governor of Vermont was held on Tuesday, September 1. In keeping with the "Mountain Rule", incumbent Republican Ryland Fletcher was a candidate for a second one-year term. The Democratic nominee was Henry Keyes, a former member of the Vermont House of Representatives and Vermont Senate who had run against Fletcher in 1856.

Vermont continued to strongly support abolitionism and the Republican Party, and Fletcher was easily re-elected. Fletcher took the oath of office for a one-year term that began on October 9.

General election

Results

References 

1857
Vermont
Gubernatorial
October 1857 events